Icchā śákti (or Iccha shakti) is a Sanskrit term translating to free will, desire, creative urge. Icca sakti is the power of desire, will, longing, wishing. When iccha sakti merges with kriya sakti, the power of action, manifestation, creation, they together generate jnana sakti, the power of knowledge and wisdom.

Iccha sakti is the natural human impulse to create. Kriya sakti is the ability to act, manifest, and create. Jnana sakti is enlightenment.

Many symbolic representations in Sanātana Dharma seek to reveal the relationship between iccha, kriya, and jnana sakti. The trident of Siva symbolizes the three saktis. Siva's son is Murugan (jnana sakti). Murugan with his earthly consort, Valli (iccha sakti), and his divine consort, Devasena (kriya sakti), represent the union of iccha and kriya to create jnana (Murugan). Krishna (jnana sakti) with his childhood love, Radha (iccha sakti), and his wife in adulthood, Rukhmani (kriya sakti). In Yoga philosophy, the ida nadi (iccha sakti) and the pingala nadi (kriya sakti) when in balance allow for energy to flow into the sushma nadi (jnana sakti).

References

Tantra
Yoga concepts
Shaktism
Shiva in art